The 2011 New South Wales Cup was the 104th season of New South Wales's top-level statewide rugby league competition. The competition was contested by eleven teams over a 30-week season (including Finals), which concluded with the 2011 Grand Final at ANZ Stadium in Sydney.

Ladder

Source:

Finals series

Grand final
A try on the siren by Jonathan Wright secured the Canterbury-Bankstown Bulldogs their third straight NSW Cup title, triumphing 30–28 over the Auckland Vulcans in the Grand Final at ANZ Stadium. The Bulldogs led by 8 points twice in the second half only to surrender both leads, with a Vulcans try in the 75th minute to Ivan Penehe seeing them take the lead 28–26. With their backs to the wall the Bulldogs secured a turnover 25 metres from the Vulcans line with 60 seconds on the clock, and sending the ball from side to side Josh Reynolds passed the ball to Wright, who evaded the defence to score the match winner as the siren sounded.

See also
 2011 NRL season
 2011 Queensland Cup

References

External links

New South Wales Cup
2011 in Australian rugby league
2011 in New Zealand rugby league